Divided Loyalties may refer to:

Divided Loyalties (film), a 1990 Canadian television film
"Divided Loyalties", a 1995 episode of the science fiction television series Babylon 5
Divided Loyalties (novel), a 1999 novel in the Doctor Who franchise